The Crystal Bucephalus is an original novel written by Craig Hinton and based on the long-running British science fiction television series Doctor Who. It features the Fifth Doctor, Tegan, Turlough and Kamelion.

Plot
The Crystal Bucephalus is a future restaurant patronised by the highest of society, projected back in time to sample the food and drink of long gone eras. However, when a notorious kingpin is slain in the Bucephalus, the Doctor, Tegan and Turlough are immediately suspected and arrested. In order to prove their innocence, they must find the real perpetrators, and in the process uncover a conspiracy 5000 years in the making.

External links
The Cloister Library - The Crystal Bucephalus

1994 British novels
1994 science fiction novels
Virgin Missing Adventures
Fifth Doctor novels
Novels by Craig Hinton